Roaring Guns is a 1944 short western film by director Jean Negulesco depicting hydraulic gold mining which became popular after the initial Gold Rush had ended and the devastating effects on the land from mud and water on local farmers. The 19 minute film uses miniature models for some of the flood scenes. The movie is considered an early film for the environmental movement.

References

1944 films
Films directed by Jean Negulesco
1944 Western (genre) films
1944 short films
Films about mining
Gold mining